Asser Fagerström (27 July 1912, Helsinki - 6 October 1990) was a Finnish pianist, composer and actor.

Fagerström studied music and appeared in a number of jazz bands in Finland before acting and first appeared in film in 1935. He made a number of appearances in Finnish film between then and the 1980s always appearing as a pianist or organist in films such as the Rauni Mollberg historical film Aika hyvä ihmiseksi in 1977 to which he also composed the soundtrack to.

In the 1950s he released a number of albums.

He died in Helsinki in 1990.

External links

1912 births
1990 deaths
Musicians from Helsinki
People from Uusimaa Province (Grand Duchy of Finland)
Finnish male film actors
Finnish male composers
Finnish film score composers
Male film score composers
Finnish pianists
20th-century Finnish male actors
20th-century pianists
Male actors from Helsinki
Male pianists
20th-century male musicians
20th-century Finnish composers